Sphenomorphus buenloicus  is a species of skink found in Vietnam.

References

buenloicus
Reptiles described in 1983
Taxa named by Ilya Darevsky
Taxa named by Nguyen Van Sang
Reptiles of Vietnam